Wilbert John Le Melle (November 11, 1931 – January 11, 2003) was an American diplomat, author and academician. He served as an Ambassador of The United States to the Republic of Kenya and to the Republic of Seychelles from 1977 to 1980. He was also a president of Mercy College (New York) and of the Phelps Stokes Fund.

Biography 
Born on November 11, 1931, in New Iberia, Louisiana to Therese and Eloi LeMelle, one of eight kids. He received a Bachelor of Arts in 1955 and a Master of Arts in 1956 from Notre Dame Seminary and a Ph.D. in political science/international relations in 1963 from the University of Denver. He served in the United States Army from 1957 to 1959.

He was an assistant professor in of history and philosophy at Grambling State University between 1956 and 1961. Between 1963 until 1965 he worked in the Department of Government at Boston University as an assistant professor and research associate in the African Studies Program. In February 1965 he started work at the Ford Foundation, as a program officer for West Africa. He spent the next nine years living in various parts of Africa with his family while his job location changed, places like Kenya, Maghreb, Algeria, Morocco, and Tunisia. In 1977, president Jimmy Carter asked Le Melle to serve as Ambassador of the United States to the Republic of Kenya and Seychelles.

References

1931 births
2003 deaths
Ambassadors of the United States to Kenya
African-American diplomats
People from New Iberia, Louisiana
University of Denver alumni
Grambling State University faculty
Boston University faculty
Notre Dame Seminary alumni
Mercy College (New York) faculty
Ambassadors of the United States to Seychelles
Heads of universities and colleges in the United States
20th-century African-American people
21st-century African-American people
20th-century American diplomats
20th-century American academics